Morrice is a village located in Shiawassee County in the U.S. state of Michigan.  The population was 927 at the 2010 census.  The village is located within Perry Township. The center of population of Michigan is located near Morrice.

History
The village was named for William Morrice, a pioneer settler from Aberdeenshire, Scotland, who moved in 1837 to the area that would become the village.

Geography

Demographics

2010 census
As of the census of 2010, there were 927 people, 367 households, and 239 families living in the village. The racial makeup of the village was 97.0% White, 0.1% African American, 0.6% Native American, 0.1% Asian, 0.3% from other races, and 1.8% from two or more races. Hispanic or Latino of any race were 1.6% of the population.

There were 367 households, of which 37.6% had children under the age of 18 living with them, 46.3% were married couples living together, 12.0% had a female householder with no husband present, 6.8% had a male householder with no wife present, and 34.9% were non-families. 30.0% of all households were made up of individuals, and 13.9% had someone living alone who was 65 years of age or older. The average household size was 2.53 and the average family size was 3.12.

The median age in the village was 32.6 years. 28.7% of residents were under the age of 18; 8.3% were between the ages of 18 and 24; 30.6% were from 25 to 44; 20.1% were from 45 to 64; and 12.4% were 65 years of age or older. The gender makeup of the village was 50.8% male and 49.2% female.

2000 census
As of the census of 2000, there were 882 people, 316 households, and 232 families living in the village. The racial makeup of the village was 95.58% White, 0.68% African American, 0.68% Native American, 0.34% Asian, 0.57% from other races, and 2.15% from two or more races. Hispanic or Latino of any race were 1.70% of the population.

There were 316 households, out of which 42.4% had children under the age of 18 living with them, 55.7% were married couples living together, 11.7% had a female householder with no husband present, and 26.3% were non-families. 19.3% of all households were made up of individuals, and 6.3% had someone living alone who was 65 years of age or older.  The average household size was 2.79 and the average family size was 3.20.

In the village, the population was spread out, with 32.2% under the age of 18, 9.0% from 18 to 24, 35.0% from 25 to 44, 17.7% from 45 to 64, and 6.1% who were 65 years of age or older.  The median age was 30 years. For every 100 females, there were 100.5 males.  For every 100 females age 18 and over, there were 96.1 males.

The median income for a household in the village was $40,417, and the median income for a family was $42,000. Males had a median income of $34,886 versus $24,196 for females. The per capita income for the village was $17,423.  About 4.3% of families and 5.1% of the population were below the poverty line, including 6.7% of those under age 18 and 7.4% of those age 65 or over.

References

External links
Village of Morrice Official Website
Official Website of Morrice Area Schools

Villages in Shiawassee County, Michigan
Villages in Michigan
Populated places established in 1837
1837 establishments in Michigan